HMS Genoa was a  74-gun ship of the line laid down for the French Navy as Brillant  which the British captured incomplete while still on slip at the fall of Genoa in 1814. She was completed for the Royal Navy and served as HMS Genoa until 1838. On 20 October 1827 Genoa took part in the Battle of Navarino where her captain Walter Bathurst was killed.

Service

Capture
Brillant was constructed at Genoa between February 1812 and April 1815, as the city had been annexed by France in 1805. On 18 April 1814 she was captured while still in construction by an invading British squadron commanded by Captain Sir Josias Rowley. She was completed by the Royal Navy as HMS Genoa and launched on 18 April 1815.

Royal Navy career

Genoa sailed for Britain after her launching and arrived at Chatham on 13 October 1815. From September 1816 to February 1818 Genoa underwent repairs to configure her as a British ship instead of the French one she was constructed as. Her first role was as guard ship at Chatham from 18 May until October 1821 under Captain Frederick Lewis Maitland. Genoa was then commissioned on 3 October under Captain Sir Thomas Livingstone to serve on the Lisbon Station, which she did until 1825. While off Lisbon, Captain William Cumberland assumed command in October 1824, and in turn was replaced by Captain Walter Bathurst who by 27 May 1825 had Genoa as part of the Mediterranean Fleet.

On 20 October 1827 Genoa and the fleet took part in the Battle of Navarino. Genoa received heavy fire during the battle in her role supporting the flagship HMS Asia, resulting in high casualty numbers. The enemy Turks fired their guns high into Genoa, killing so many Royal Marines on the poop deck that they were forced to retreat to the lower quarterdeck to lessen their casualties. She had the most men killed during the battle of the British ships present, twenty six, including Captain Bathurst. Bathurst was injured early on by a large splinter lacerating his face, and was later killed by a round shot. Command of Genoa during the battle then devolved to her second captain, Commander Richard Dickinson. Admiral Edward Codrington described Genoa'''s manoeuvres to assist his flagship during the battle as 'beautiful'. Captain Charles Leonard Irby was appointed by Codrington to take Genoa home in the place of Bathurst, and by November she had arrived at Plymouth.Genoa was paid off in January 1828 before becoming a receiving ship between 1833 and 1837. She was broken up at Plymouth in January 1838.

Notes and Citations
Notes

Citations

References
 Clowes, William Laird (1900) The Royal Navy: A History from the Earliest Times to 1900 Volume Five. London: Sampson Low, Marston and Company. 
 Clowes, William Laird (1901) The Royal Navy: A History from the Earliest Times to 1900 Volume Six. London: Sampson Low, Marston and Company. 
 Laughton, John Knox (1885) Dictionary of National Biography, 1885-1900, Volume 03. London: Smith, Elder & Co.
 O'Byrne, William R. (1849) A Naval Biographical Dictionary: Comprising the Life and Services of every Living Officer in Her Majesty's Navy, from the Rank of Admiral of the Fleet to that of Lieutenant, inclusive Volume 2.'' London: J. Murray.

External links
 
 Ships of the Old Navy

Ships of the line of the French Navy
Ships of the line of the Royal Navy
Téméraire-class ships of the line
1815 ships